AIK Atlas is a Swedish football club located in Sturkö.

Background
AIK Atlas currently plays in Division 4 Blekinge which is the sixth tier of Swedish football. They play their home matches at the Havsvallen in Sturkö.

The club is affiliated to Blekinge Fotbollförbund. AIK Atlas have competed in the Svenska Cupen on 9 occasions and have completed a total of 14 matches.

Season to season

Footnotes

External links
 AIK Atlas – Official website
 AIK Atlas on Facebook

Football clubs in Blekinge County